Hans Düringer was a clockmaker from Nuremberg in Germany who died 1477 in Rostock. His most famous works are 
the Gdańsk Astronomical Clock in St. Mary's Church, Gdańsk 1470 
the Rostock Astronomical Clock in St. Mary's Church, Rostock 1472 which belongs to the so-called "Baltic clock family ".

According to the tradition, after Düringer made the clock of Gdańsk, the authorities had him blinded so that he couldn't build another such wonder. On a final inspection he destroyed the clock and escaped with the help of his daughter. After a long journey Düringer came to Rostock where he was welcomed with open arms. The authorities of Rostock offered him a deal: he could stay in Rostock for free for the rest of his life when he was willing to build a new astronomical clock in St. Mary's. Under his supervision, the new clock was built. In 1477 he died and was buried in Danzig.

References

1477 deaths
German clockmakers
German artisans
Businesspeople from Nuremberg
Year of birth unknown